Keñes Hamitūly Raqyşev (born 14 July 1979) is a Kazakh businessman and public figure, international Investor, and founder of Fincraft Group. Included in the Forbes Top 50 influential entrepreneurs in Kazakhstan, his personal wealth is estimated at $960 million.

According to Forbes in 2022, Rakishev was the owner of Fincraft Investment House JSC, Fincraft Resources JSC, Fincraft Group LLP, which manages BTA Bank, and more than 20 companies operating in Eastern Europe, Israel, United States, UAE, Isle of Man and Cyprus.

Early life and education
Rakishev was born on July 14, 1979 in Almaty. His father is Kazakh statesman and public figure Khamit Rakishev, who was the head of Kazakhstan's Chamber of Commerce and Industry.

He graduated with a law degree from the Kazakh National Law Academy in 2000.

In 2002 he graduated with a BA in International Economics from the T. Ryskulov Kazakh Economic University in Almaty.

In 2007, Rakishev received an Advanced Management, Business Administration and General Management Diploma from the Saïd Business School in Oxford. He also earned a London Business School certification in Developing Strategy for Value Creation, Business Administration, Management and Operations.

Career 
Kenes Rakishev's first place of work was the Road Safety Foundation, where he worked in 1998 - 1999.

From 2000 to 2002 he worked as a specialist of the training center of JSC "Bank Turan-Alem", manager of CJSC "KazTransGas"; specialist, and later – head of marketing department from logistics Department of CJSC "Intergas Central Asia".

From 2002 to 2004, Head of the WPP Department of KazTransGas CJSC, First Deputy General Director for Export of KazMunayGas Trading House LLP, Deputy General Director for Marketing of KazTransGas JSC.

In 2004 - 2005 he worked as the General Director of Mercury LLP. In 2006 Rakishev became a Chairman of the Board of Directors JSC "SAT & Company". And in 2007, he became Chairman of its Management Board. This year Kenes got a member of the board of directors of JSC "Petrochemical Industry of Kazakhstan".

Rakishev is involved with venture funds such as SingulariTeam and Fastlane Ventures. He was the controlling shareholder of the Kazakh commercial bank JSC "Kazkommertsbank" and the bank's chairman of the board of directors. He is a shareholder of the Central Asia Metals PLC mining company.

In 2012, Rakishev invested $20 million in a social media platform for sharing photos and videos called Mobli. The co-investors of this project are Leonardo DiCaprio, Tobey Maguire, Serena Williams, Lance Armstrong, Carlos Slim. Kenes Rakishev became a member of the company's management board.

From 2013 to 2019, Rakishev was a member of the board of directors of Central Asia Metals.

In 2014, Rakishev joined the board of directors of JSC National Company "Kazakhstan Engineering", a large holding combining 27 enterprises of the defensive industry and munitions factories of the Ministry of Defence of the Republic of Kazakhstan. He left the board one year later, upon the appointment of Imangali Tasmagambetov as the new Minister of Defence.

In 2014, Rakishev obtained a controlling stake in BTA Bank from the Kazakh government, after the President of Kazakhstan temporarily nationalized the bank, which had been seized BTA Bank from Kazakhstani billionaire and pro-democracy activist Mukhtar Ablyazov. Ablyazov had been accused of embezzlement of funds, abuse of official authority, creation of a criminal group and theft of $6 billion from BTA Bank in 1999. The main assets of the company were its claims against Ablyazov, estimated at $6 billion.

In 2015, Rakishev controlled over 75% of SAT & Company's shares. He also bought Sedmoi Kanal (Channel Seven), a Kazakhstan national TV channel in that year.

In 2018, Kenes Rakishev acquired a 22% stake in the London-listed gold mining company Petropavlovsk PLC. In 2019 he sold his share.

As of 2018, Rakishev's Venture fund, Singulariteam, owned over 30% of General Robotics, an Israeli company that develops robotic solutions for the military, and over 40 other high-tech companies.

In 2021, he co-founded and became chairman of Sirin Labs, a Blockchain startup, funded by almost $158 million in the form of an Initial coin offering (ICO), released the long-awaited "blockchain smartphone" FINNEY. Lionel Messi became the brand's Ambassador.

Social activities
Rakishev became Vice-President of the Union of the Chamber of Commerce and Industry of the Republic of Kazakhstan in 2005.

Rakishev was elected vice-president of National Sports Association of Kazakhstan in 2004, vice-president of the (ASBC) Asian Boxing Confederation in 2011, and president of the Kazakhstan Judo Federation in 2012.

Personal life 

Rakishev is married to Aselle Tasmagambetova, daughter of Kazakh politician and diplomat Imangali Tasmagambetov.

References 

Living people
Alumni of Saïd Business School
Kazakhstani businesspeople
Kazakhstani investors
1979 births